Saskatchewan Federation of Labour v Saskatchewan [2015] 1 SCR 245 is a Canadian labour law case on the right to strike.

Facts
The Saskatchewan Federation of Labour and a group of other unions claimed that two new provincial statutes violated the Canadian Charter of Rights and Freedoms by suppressing the freedom to take collective action and collective bargaining. The government of Saskatchewan introduced Public Service Essential Services Act 2008 which would have unilaterally designated public sector workers' services as "essential" and therefore prohibited strike action. The new Trade Union Amendment Act 2008 increased the level of employee support to unionize, so making it more difficult to organize a union.

Judgment
The Canadian Supreme Court held that the Public Service Essential Services Act 2008 was an unwarranted interference with the right to strike and the right to collective bargaining, as previously elaborated in Health Services and Support – Facilities Subsector Bargaining Assn. v British Columbia and Mounted Police Association of Ontario v Canada (Attorney General). It was unconstitutional and violated the Canadian Charter section 2(d) because it left a determination of what was essential up to the employer. The Trade Union Amendment Act 2008 was lawful, even though it made union organizing more difficult. Abella J gave the leading judgment, saying the following.

McLachlin CJ, LeBel J, Cromwell J and Karakatsanis J concurred.

Rothstein J and Wagner J dissented in part.

See also
Canadian labour law
US labor law
UK labour law
European labour law

Notes

References

Canadian labour case law
Labour disputes in Canada
Trade union case law
Saskatchewan law
Section Two Charter case law
Supreme Court of Canada cases
2015 in Canadian case law